Paul Crossan (born 7 May 1973, also known as Rick O'Shea) is an Irish radio personality. He was born in Drimnagh, Dublin 12, grew up in Crumlin, and attended Drimnagh Castle Secondary School and later UCD. He has been a presenter on RTÉ 2fm since 2001. O'Shea has also presented The Poetry Programme on RTÉ Radio 1 in 2015 and 2016. Since 2017 he has been presenting the morning show on RTÉ Gold. He is currently presenting The Book Show on RTÉ Radio 1 since 2019.

Activities
Before joining RTÉ 2fm in 2001, he had worked for East Coast Radio, Atlantic 252, South East Radio and FM104. Rick had previously been involved with hospital radio.   O'Shea presented the weekday afternoon show on 2fm until 2015, when the show was moved to the weekend schedule.

He presented The Poetry Programme on RTÉ Radio 1  in 2015 and 2016.

O'Shea was diagnosed with epilepsy at the age of 16. and has been a patron of Epilepsy Ireland, formerly known as Brainwave, the Irish Epilepsy Association, since 2006. He represented the charity in an Irish celebrity version of the quiz show Mastermind in 2012, winning the competition.

He runs The Rick O’Shea Book Club – Ireland's largest book club with over 28,000 members and recommends the Eason Must Reads lists 4 times a year with author Sinéad Moriarty. He is currently presenting The Book Show on RTÉ Radio 1.

Awards and nominations
O'Shea has been nominated for Best Irish Radio DJ at the Meteor Music Awards on three occasions, in 2002, 2008 and 2009.  In 2009 he was winner of Entertainment.ie's "Sexiest Radio Voice" award.

References

External links
Rick's blog
Rick's page at RTÉ
Interview with United Irelander blog

1973 births
Living people
East Coast FM presenters
FM104 presenters
Irish bloggers
People from County Dublin
RTÉ 2fm presenters
South East Radio presenters
People educated at Drimnagh Castle Secondary School